Alot is a town and nagar panchayat in the Ratlam district of Madhya Pradesh, India.

Demographics
Alot has a population of 40,948.

Culture
Alot is a tehsil of Ratlam district and the hometown of the Jangalwa Dynasty. 
Alot is a main station for Jain ; Jain people go there daily for the darshan of Lord Jain Swetamber. A small village, Vikramgarh, is also part of Alot. This is because some of the land of Alot lies within the boundary of Vikramgarh so the full name of Alot is Vikramgarh Alot. Major attractions of Alot are Anadikalpeshwar Mahadev temple, Ramsingh Darbar and Nageshwar temple. Annually around May–June a fair is organized by Alot municipal corporation Nagarpalika Alot. Main festivals celebrated by the people of Alot are Diwali, Holi, Rakshabandhan, Eid, Navratri, Dashahra, and Ganesh Chaturthi.

See also 
 Kharwa Kala, a villa under Alot taluka

References 

Cities and towns in Ratlam district